Dakshayagnam refers to Daksha yajna:
Films based on the Daksha yaga:

 Dakshayagnam (1938 film), a 1938 Tamil film starring V. A. Chellappa, N. S. Krishnan and T. A. Mathuram
 Dakshayagnam (1962 film), a 1962 Telugu film starring N. T. Rama Rao, S. V. Ranga Rao and Devika